Best of the Vanguard Years is a compilation album by American banjoist Alison Brown, released in 2002.

Track listing 
All compositions by Alison Brown.

 "Wolf Moon" – 2:54
 "Chicken Road" – 4:27
 "Without Anastasia" – 3:14
 "Mambo Banjo" – 4:01
 "Shoot the Dog" – 3:26
 "Cara's Way" – 5:20
 "G Bop" – 3:10
 "Waltzing with Tula" – 3:04
 "The Dalai Camel" – 5:41
 "Deep North" – 5:40
 "Saint Geneviève" – 4:03
 "Leaving Cottondale" – 2:36
 "Lorelei" – 4:38
 "Look Left" – 5:02
 "Hello Mendocino!" – 4:01
 "The Inspector" – 3:08
 "Simple Pleasures" – 2:51

Personnel 
 Alison Brown – banjo, guitar
 Garry West - bass
 John R. Burr - piano
 Rick Reed - drums, percussion

Guest musicians 

 Vassar Clements - violin
 John Catchings - violoncello
 Joe Craven - percussion
 Tony Rice - guitar
 Scott Nygaard - guitar
 Alison Krauss - violin
 Roy M. Husky jr - bass
 Mike Marshall - guitar, mandolin
 Joey Dukes - drums
 Matt Eakle - flute
 Seamus Egan - penny whistle, uilleann pipes
 Sam Bacco - percussion, cowbell
 Alan Dargin - didjeridu

References 

Alison Brown albums
2002 greatest hits albums
Vanguard Records compilation albums